Folkestone West railway station is on the South Eastern Main Line in England, serving the western area of Folkestone, Kent. It is  down the line from London Charing Cross. All trains that call are operated by Southeastern.

The ticket office, in a room on the extensive 'up' side buildings on the London-bound platform, is staffed only during part of the day; at other times a PERTIS permit to travel machine, located outside the ticket office, suffices. The substantial 'down' (country-bound) platform building is occupied as offices by Network Rail.

History 
The South Eastern Main Line reached Folkestone in 1843, with a station being opened at Folkestone Junction (Folkestone East) on 18 December 1843. Folkestone West was opened on 1 November 1863 as Shorncliffe Camp, initially with two platform faces either side of double track. In 1881 the station was rebuilt with two platform faces either side of four tracks. Sometime around 1887 a bay was added to the down platform as from 1887 to 1947 the station served as the southern terminus and interchange for the Elham Valley Railway with services to Canterbury. The station was altered during the 1960–61 Kent Coast Electrification as the line from Folkestone Central to near the site of Cheriton Junction was quadrupled.
Following the opening of the Channel Tunnel and the loss of the boat train traffic, in 1994 the two centre tracks were removed.

In 2008 alterations were made on the north side of the station to provide car parking and coach loading bays, the latter in connection with the operation of the 'Orient Express' which until then operated from Folkestone Harbour Station.

Services
All services at Folkestone West are operated by Southeastern using  and  EMUs.

The typical off-peak service in trains per hour is:
 1 tph to London St Pancras International
 1 tph to London Charing Cross via 

Belmond transferred their Orient Express luxury train services to a new facility at Folkestone West from their original location at Folkestone Harbour. The company runs two British Pullman trains per week between the end of March and the beginning of November, which connect via the Channel Tunnel with the Venice Simplon Orient Express train in Calais.

References

External links

Transport in Folkestone and Hythe
Railway stations in Kent
DfT Category E stations
Former South Eastern Railway (UK) stations
Railway stations in Great Britain opened in 1863
Railway stations in Great Britain closed in 1881
Railway stations in Great Britain opened in 1881
Railway stations served by Southeastern
Folkestone
1863 establishments in England